The Las Cienegas Stakes is a Grade III American thoroughbred horse race for fillies and mares age four and up over a distance of about six and one-half furlongs on the Hillside Turf Course held annually in January at Santa Anita Park in Arcadia, California, USA.  The event currently offers a purse of US$100,000.

History

The inaugural running of the event was on 17 February 1974 as the Las Cienegas Handicap, a sprint over the Downhill turf course over a distance of about six and one-half furlongs for horses that were four-years-old or older. The event was won by Woodland Pines who was ridden by US Hall of Fame jockey Donald R. Pierce in a time of 1:13 flat.

The following year the event was not held.

In 1976 the event was run with conditions for three-year-olds only on the dirt track over a distance of six furlongs. The event was won by Life's Hope who later that year would win the Grade 1 Jersey Derby. In 1977 the event was scheduled in April as with handicap conditions for fillies and mares age four and up over a distance of six and one-half furlongs on the Downhill turf course. The event continued to be scheduled usually in April until 2017 when it was moved to January.

The event was upgraded in 1992 by the American Graded Stakes Committee to Grade III race. In 2013 the event's conditions were changes to a stakes allowance race and the name modified to Las Cienegas Stakes.

The event has been moved to the dirt due to weather conditions in 1979, 1982, 1983, 1986, 2012, 2016, 2017 and 2019.

In 2012 the event was moved to the dirt track and was won by Mizdirection. Mizdirection later that year would return to Santa Anita and win the Breeders' Cup Turf Sprint. Mizdirection would repeat the unique double in 2013 again winning both events. Mizdirection is the only dual winner of the event.
 
Due to poor state of the Downhill turf course in 2020 and 2021 the event was held on the proper turf course at a shorter distance.
On 11 January 2020, the Las Cienegas Stakes was run for the first time at a distance of  furlongs on turf. Brazilian import Jolie Olimpica, making her first start in the United States, set a new Santa Anita Park course record of 1:01 flat for that distance.

In the 2021 running of the event Charmaine's Mia set a new course record for the 6 furlong distance.

Records

Speed record:
 about  furlongs on turf:  1:11.66  – Elusive Diva (2005)
 furlongs on dirt:  1:14.40 –  Excitable Lady (1982)

Margins:
 lengths – Watch This Cat  (2015)

Most wins:
 2 - Mizdirection (2012, 2013)

Most wins by a jockey:
 4 - Kent Desormeaux (1998, 2002, 2005, 2018)

Most wins by a trainer:
 4 - Gary F. Jones (1981, 1987, 1992, 1996)
 4 - Robert J. Frankel (1989, 2002, 2003, 2004)
 4 - Richard E. Mandella (1997, 1999, 2016, 2020)

Most wins by an owner:
 2 - Golden Eagle Farm (1992, 1997)
 2 - Juddmonte Farms (2003, 2004)
 2 - Jungle Racing and partners (2012, 2013)

Winners

Legend:

 

Notes:

§ Ran as an entry

† In 2002, Bahama Mama (IRE) won the race but was disqualified and place fourth after stewards ruled she had drifted in the straight. Lightmyfirebaby was declared the winner, Wake Up Maggie (IRE) moved to second and Super Freaky to third.

See also
List of American and Canadian Graded races

External links
 2020 Santa Anita Media Guide

References

Horse races in California
Santa Anita Park
Sprint category horse races for fillies and mares
Turf races in the United States
Recurring sporting events established in 1974
1974 establishments in California
Grade 3 stakes races in the United States